George Davenport was an American football coach.  He was the third head football coach at  Tennessee A&I State Normal College—now known as Tennessee State University—in Nashville, Tennessee and he held that position for two seasons, from 1925 until 1926, compiling a record of 5–3–3.

References

Year of birth missing
Year of death missing
Tennessee State Tigers football coaches